Touch the Sky is a 2007 drama film directed by Marcos Carnevale and starring Facundo Arana, Betiana Blum, and China Zorrilla. It is a co-production between Argentina and Spain. It tells two stories that take place between Buenos Aires and Madrid.

Plot
The story begins on New Year's Eve. A group of friends have a tradition that they carry out every year at the same time in Argentina and in Spain. At midnight in Buenos Aires and at five o'clock in the morning in Madrid, one of them sends up a balloon with a sheet of paper hanging from the string below it, on which they have written their wishes for the new year.

Cast

See also 
 List of Spanish films of 2007
 List of Argentine films of 2007

References

External links
 
 

2007 films
2007 drama films
2000s English-language films
2000s Spanish-language films
Argentine drama films
Films directed by Marcos Carnevale
Films set in Buenos Aires
Films set in Madrid
Films shot in Buenos Aires
Films shot in Madrid
Spanish drama films
English-language Argentine films
English-language Spanish films
2000s Argentine films
2000s Spanish films